The Parliament Act 1660 (12 Cha. 2 c.1) was an Act of the Convention Parliament of England of 1660. The Act declared the Long Parliament to be dissolved, and the Lords and Commons then sitting to be the two Houses of Parliament, notwithstanding that they had not been convened by the King.

Since some doubts still existed as to the validity of the Act, since the Convention Parliament had not been regularly summoned by the king, the next Parliament passed further Acts, 13 Cha. 2 cc. 7 & 14, confirming the laws passed by the previous parliament.

Repeal
The whole Act was repealed on 1 January 1970 by section 1 of, and Part I of the Schedule to, the Statute Law (Repeals) Act 1969. It was repealed because it was felt to be "no longer of practical utility".

This Act was repealed for the Republic of Ireland by sections 2(1) and 3(1) of, and Part 2 of Schedule 2 to, the Statute Law Revision Act 2007.

See also

Crown and Parliament Recognition Act 1689
Parliament Act (disambiguation)

References

External links
 The Parliament Act 1660, as originally enacted, John Raithby, The Statutes of the Realm, vol. 5, p. 179  (from British History Online)
 List of amendments and repeals in the Republic of Ireland from the Irish Statute Book.

Acts of the Parliament of England
1660 in law
Parliament of England
1660 in England